Ivan "Ivica" Grnja, also known as John Grnja (born 26 April 1949) is a Croatian football manager and former professional player.

Playing career
Grnja joined NK Osijek from Metalac Osijek in 1972, forming a formidable striking partnership with Ivan Lukačević and played in the North American Soccer League for the Toronto Metros-Croatia and the Tampa Bay Rowdies.

Coaching career
Grnja has managed Croatian club side NK Osijek on two occasions – in 1991, and between 1993 and 1994.

Grnja also managed the Croatia under-21 side in 2005, and the under-19 side in 2008.

References

1949 births
Living people
People from Darda, Croatia
Association football forwards
Yugoslav footballers
NK Metalac Osijek players
NK Osijek players
Toronto Blizzard (1971–1984) players
Tampa Bay Rowdies (1975–1993) players
North American Soccer League (1968–1984) players
Yugoslav expatriate footballers
Expatriate soccer players in Canada
Yugoslav expatriate sportspeople in Canada
Expatriate soccer players in the United States
Yugoslav expatriate sportspeople in the United States
Croatian football managers
NK Osijek managers
Croatia national under-21 football team managers
Croatia national under-19 football team managers